Mohammad Iqram Dinzly Muhammad Saipuddin (born 29 September 1981) is a Malaysian actor and television host. In February 2019, he rebranded himself as IQ Dinzly while stating that his former stage name has been 'dead'.

Career
He debuted in 2005 and acted in a few dramas and films in 2006. He is noted for the television series Janji Diana (as Ijoy) and Dunia Baru (as Umar Darius) in which he appeared in the programme's second and third seasons.

Apart from acting, he is also a dancer and model. Iqram went on indefinite hiatus from show business in 2018, following his father's death and prior to his bankruptcy.

Personal life
He is the third of four siblings and was born in Ipoh, Perak. He has a Diploma in Performing Arts from Universiti Teknologi Mara (UITM).

In January 2019, Iqram was declared bankrupt by the Malaysian Inland Revenue Board (IRB) after he failed to pay income tax for RM77,000. He discloses this at his Instagram account. He received a notice from the IRB lawyer at Ipoh Magistrate Court on 15 January, Iqram later said that it was his own mistake and he may not be returning to showbiz.

Discography

Filmography

Film

Television series

Telemovie

Television

Music video

Advertising campaigns
 Petronas Hari Raya (2005)
 Mister Potato (Gila Kentang)
 Hotlink

Awards and nominations
In 2006, he won the Bachelor With Not A Hair Out of Place organised by Cleo magazine.

References

External links
 

1981 births
Living people
Malaysian male film actors
Malaysian male dancers
People from Ipoh
Malaysian male models
People from Perak
Malaysian male television actors
21st-century Malaysian male actors
Pesona Pictures contract players
Tayangan Unggul contract players
Grand Brilliance contract players